WTJU is a Variety formatted broadcast radio station licensed to Charlottesville, Virginia, serving Charlottesville and Albemarle County, Virginia.  WTJU is owned and operated by University of Virginia.

History

WTJU was founded in 1955 when U.Va.’s Department of Speech and Drama decided to start an educational radio station to serve the larger community. WUVA, the university's carrier current AM station, had been broadcasting popular music to students since 1947. The fraternity Kappa Delta Pi put up a large part of the funds necessary to get the station off the ground. On May 10, 1957, WTJU went on the air at 91.3 FM with a classical music format. It was able to broadcast throughout Charlottesville, building a small but dedicated group of listeners.

In 1959, the station aired its first ever music marathon: the Classical Marathon, held during U.Va.’s exam period. In 1963, WTJU became a full-fledged student organization, separate from the U.Va. Department of Speech and Drama. By 1971, WTJU began broadcasting rock music, as well as some jazz and folk programs. By 1974, WTJU was broadcasting 24 hours a day. It also allowed non-students to be DJs in order to keep the station broadcasting 24/7 year-round.

In 1993, WTJU's license was threatened when student administrators accidentally violated FCC rules in filing a routine document. The Dean of Students office insisted the station hire its first paid staff member, General Manager Chuck Taylor, requiring a transition from an independent student organization – the model followed by WUVA – to direct oversight from the university. In the same year, WTJU changed its frequency from 91.3 to 91.1 FM. In the late 1990s, planned construction at U.Va.'s Peabody Hall forced WTJU to relocate into studios in Lambeth Commons. By 2010, WTJU had also started streaming its radio programming over the internet.

Taylor retired in 2010. At the time, the station had low listenership and was in deep financial trouble. Administrators pressed ahead with a search for new management, even as the university Board of Visitors approved turning in the station's license if they did not see a path to viability. Burr Beard was hired as Taylor's replacement in April 2010. Beard proposed sweeping changes to the station’s operation: abandoning the longstanding freeform scheduling policy in favor of a focus on "Americana" music; moving specialty jazz and rock programs to evening and late night, respectively; eliminating classical music altogether; and instituting a small rotation of four songs per hour. Beard's proposals led to backlash from both volunteers and listeners, who feared the potential loss of the station's identity and cancellations of specialty shows. Beard resigned in October 2010 without implementing any changes and the station began its search for a new manager. In 2011, Nathan Moore was hired and is the current general manager. The station has seen a resurgence of interest and increased fundraising in the following years.

In 2011, WTJU participated in the first-ever College Radio Day. In 2012, WTJU aired a live remote broadcast of the "Rally on the Lawn" demonstration against the ouster of U.Va. President Teresa A. Sullivan.  Also in 2012, WTJU aired a special modern adaptation of The War of the Worlds on Halloween night.

On February 1, 2015, WTJU entered into a three-year local marketing agreement with WHAN (1430 AM) in Ashland, Virginia. WTJU's programming was rebroadcast on WHAN and its FM translator (W275BQ, 102.9 FM) to cover the city of Richmond with a broadcast signal. WTJU exited the agreement early on August 16, 2017, as the signal was found to be inadequate and the increase in underwriting from the Richmond market did not offset the cost.

In addition to its on-air activities, WTJU also produces a variety of music and educational events such as live concerts, film screenings, and youth radio camps. Since 2015, WTJU has hosted a series of free outdoor concerts at Charlottesville's IX Art Park each fall, emphasizing eclectic music and creative community building.

In March 2019, WTJU and WXTJ-LP moved into new studios, which include a stage for live performances and community events. On March 23, the station opened the new studios by breaking the Guinness World Record for "most radio DJs presenting one radio show simultaneously," although it only briefly held the title as it was broken again 18 days later.

Among the well-known artists who have been DJs at WTJU are Pavement's Stephen Malkmus, Dave Matthews Band's Boyd Tinsley, Rolling Stone critic Rob Sheffield, Yo La Tengo's James McNew, Jagjaguwar founder Darius Van Arman, and blues musician Corey Harris.

WXTJ

Hiring professional staff in the 1990s necessitated removing WTJU from limits on non-university-affiliated members that bind student organizations and club sports. Initially brought on to keep the station running over breaks, community members began making up an increasing proportion of announcers in the 1990s and 2000s. In response to declining student involvement, WTJU founded WXTJ-LP (100.1 FM), a sister station run and staffed entirely by students, in October 2013. WXTJ operates within WTJU's building and primarily consists of rock, hip hop, and electronic music. Several student DJs host programs on both stations.

Programming
WTJU allows its volunteer DJs to play nearly anything they choose, as long as it does not violate Federal Communications Commission (FCC) rules for decency. All of WTJU's DJs are volunteers from the community, including U.Va. students, faculty and staff, alumni, and community members. Most of the shows feature music and are broadly categorized into classical, folk, jazz and blues, and rock. The music across all genres tends to be highly eclectic, with a heavy emphasis on music that is rarely, if ever, heard on commercial radio stations.

The station is not a member of NPR, although its schedule includes some spoken-word programming in overnights and short public-affairs modules during and between shows.

See also
List of community radio stations in the United States

References

External links
 91.1 WTJU Online
 
 "Radioheads: locals succumb to the call of the airwaves" 2007 article in The Hook
 "After time of turmoil, WTJU reprograms, increases fundraising" 2012 article in The Daily Progress
 "WTJU keeps it eclectic" 2013 article in The Daily Progress
 "Charlottesville Radio Station Celebrates a Century of Jazz" 2017 article in U.S. News & World Report
 "Radio Station Visit #129 – WTJU at University of Virginia" 2017 article in Radio Survivor

1957 establishments in Virginia
Variety radio stations in the United States
Radio stations established in 1957
TJU
TJU
Community radio stations in the United States
University of Virginia
Mass media in Charlottesville, Virginia